Boonsai Sangsurat (Thai: เม็ดเงิน 3เคแบตเตอรี่; born 12 July 1978), better known as Medgoen Singsurat, is a Thai former professional boxer.

Sangsurat has assumed various ring names, including Big Daddy Med (Thai: เม็ดเงิน กระทิงแดงยิม) and Medgoen Lukjaopormahesak (Thai: เม็ดเงิน ลูกเจ้าพ่อมเหศักดิ์), albeit his real name or birth name has been confirmed as "Boonsai Sangsurat" (Thai: บุญใส สังสุราช). The non-Thai media also refer to him as Medgoen Singsurat, 3K Battery for Filipinos or simply Medgoen Singh.

Boxing career
Medgoen is a southpaw fighter who turned pro in 1997 and in 1999, captured the Lineal Flyweight Championship with a win over Filipino boxer Manny Pacquiao. Because of his win over Manny Pacquiao, Medgoen's name is often mentioned during Pacquiao's fights, because he is one of the eight opponents to have beaten Pacquiao (the other seven being Rustico Torrecampo, Erik Morales, Timothy Bradley, Juan Manuel Márquez, Floyd Mayweather Jr., Yordenis Ugas and Jeff Horn), and one of the three opponents to have knocked Pacquiao out. He is the second boxer to defeat Pacquiao in the latter's overall pro boxing career. He also won the vacant WBC Flyweight title that had been stripped from Pacquiao due to Pacquiao coming overweight at the weight-ins. He defended the titles once more before losing the titles in 2000 to Malcolm Tuñacao by TKO.

Medgoen is promoted by Thai Storage Battery Public Company Limited, and hence bears the 3K Battery name, as the company contracts Thai boxers to sponsor their products.

Medgoen Singsurat has a family full of boxers. His 2nd cousin, Saranyoo Tohchoodee, born April 18, 1991 in Thailand, also was a professional boxer before giving up boxing to go to America to study along with his sister.

Outside boxing
Besides being one of the greatest youth boxers in Southeast Asia, he was also a soccer prodigy. He was going to play for the Thailand national team until he broke his ankle in a game and never could fully recover, but he did manage to become a very good table tennis player in the meantime. He was the top ranked youth player in Thailand for 2 years in a row.

Professional boxing record

See also
List of flyweight boxing champions
List of WBC world champions

References

External links

Medgoen 3K-Battery - CBZ Profile

1978 births
Living people
Medgoen Singsurat
Medgoen Singsurat
Medgoen Singsurat
Bantamweight boxers